The 1950 Boston University Terriers football team was an American football team that represented Boston University as an independent during the 1950 college football season. In its fourth season under head coach Aldo Donelli, the team compiled a 3–5 record and was outscored by their opponents by a total of 187 to 139.

Schedule

References

Boston University
Boston University Terriers football seasons
Boston University Terriers football